Justice Baxter may refer to:

Elisha Baxter (1827–1899), chief justice of the Supreme Court of Arkansas
Marvin R. Baxter (born 1940), associate justice of the Supreme Court of California